Home Invasion is the fifth studio album by American rapper Ice-T, released on March 23, 1993, via /Priority Records. It was originally set for release in 1992 as part of his deal with Sire/Warner Bros. Records, and supposed to be his first official release through his own  record label, now in full control of the content as part of a new distribution deal with Priority Records.

Background 
Home Invasion was the first album that Ice-T released following the controversy over the Body Count song "Cop Killer". Sire/Warner Bros. Records had stood by freedom of expression during the controversy, although some within the Time Warner conglomerate now favored a more pragmatic policy. The album was originally set for a November 15, 1992 release, but the Rodney King riots were still fresh in people's minds, an election was in process, and politically-minded releases by Ice Cube and Dr. Dre were causing controversy, so Ice-T agreed to postpone Home Invasions release, in addition to removing the song "Ricochet", which had already appeared on the soundtrack to the film of the same name.

With the album's release postponed to February 14, 1993, Sire/Warner Bros. told Ice-T that it would not release the album with its current artwork, painted by Dave Halili (cover artist for Body Count), which depicted a white boy seemingly immersed in black culture, surrounded by images of violence, mayhem and disorder. Although the catalog number 45119 was already assigned to it and the single "Gotta Lotta Love" was released, the album was still deferred. Ice-T initially agreed, opting for an all-black cover and a name change to The Black Album. He later realized that his future output would be continuously monitored and censored, so he left the label amicably, signing a distribution deal with Priority Records, which released the album with the originally intended artwork. Due to the postponed release of the album, tracks were altered to keep the topics up-to-date.

Reception

The album peaked at #9 on Billboard magazine's Top R&B/Hip-Hop Albums and at #14 on the Billboard 200. Home Invasion was met with mixed reviews from music critics. Robert Christgau gave the album a B+, saying "At first it sounds as if the bad guys won—from sexy stories to O.G. kissoffs, he spends too much time proving he's still Ice Motherfucking T. But in fact he contextualizes himself as shrewdly as ever". Stephen Thomas Erlewine of AllMusic gave the album two and a half stars out of five, saying "Given the fact that most of Home Invasion was recorded during and after the "Cop Killer" media firestorm, it comes as no surprise that the album is an uneven, muddled affair, not the clean, focused attack of O.G. Original Gangster". On June 1, 1993, the album was certified gold by Recording Industry Association of America. It is Ice-T's last studio album to receive a certification from the RIAA.

Track listing

Personnel 

 Tracy Lauren Marrow – main artist, producer (tracks: 2-4, 6, 8-11, 13, 15-18, 20-23, 26), executive producer, design
 Eric Garcia – featured artist (track 12)
 Daddy Nitro – featured artist (track 15)
 Mark D. Ross – featured artist (track 16)
 Brandi Younger – featured artist (track 17)
 Lloyd "Mooseman" Roberts III – bass (tracks: 9, 15)
 Alphonso Henderson – producer (tracks: 2-4, 6, 8-11, 15-18, 20, 22-23, 26), mixing
 Shafiq "SLJ" Husayn – producer (tracks: 2-4, 6, 8-11, 15-16, 18, 20, 22, 26)
 Wendel Winston – producer (tracks: 5, 12, 25)
 Henry Garcia – producer (tracks: 5, 12, 25)
 Donald Lamont – producer (tracks: 13, 21)
 Trekan – producer (track 14)
 Wolf – producer (track 17)
 The Beatnuts – producers (track 24)
 Tom Baker – mastering
 Tony Pizarro – engineering & mixing
 Kev D – assistant engineering & management
 Jorge Hinojosa – management
 Mickey Benson – management
 Steve Stewart – management
 David M. Halili – album cover painting & lettering
 Dirk Walter – design supervisor
 Jesse Frohman – photography

Charts

Certifications

References

External links
Smithsonian National Museum of American History
Home Invasion album at Discogs

1993 albums
Ice-T albums
Sire Records albums
Priority Records albums
Albums produced by DJ Aladdin